Emmett Key "Parson" Perryman (October 24, 1888 – September 12, 1966) was a professional baseball player. He was a right-handed pitcher for one season (1915) with the St. Louis Browns, during which he compiled a 2-4 record, with a 3.93 earned run average, and 19 strikeouts in 50⅓ innings pitched.

An alumnus of Emory University (1913) when it was located in Oxford, Georgia, he was born in Everett Springs, Georgia and died in Starke, Florida at the age of 77. He was inducted into the Emory University Sports Hall of Fame in 1997.

External links

1888 births
1966 deaths
St. Louis Browns players
Major League Baseball pitchers
Baseball players from Georgia (U.S. state)
Atlanta Crackers players
Birmingham Barons players
Chattanooga Lookouts players
Akron Buckeyes players
Syracuse Stars (minor league baseball) players
Galveston Pirates players
Newark Bears (IL) players
Galveston Sand Crabs players
San Antonio Bears players
Pensacola Pilots players
Selma Selmians players
Pensacola Fliers players
Tampa Krewes players
Emory Eagles baseball players
People from Floyd County, Georgia